Bondar Rural District is a rural district (dehestan) in the Senderk District of Minab County, Hormozgan Province, Iran. At the 2006 census, its population was 3,512, in 787 families.  The rural district has 24 villages.

References 

Rural Districts of Hormozgan Province
Minab County